The Huntsville Commercial Historic District encompasses the historic elements of the business district of Huntsville, Arkansas, the county seat of Madison County.  It covers an area three blocks by two, extending east–west between Hughes and Harris Streets, and north–south between War Eagle and Church Streets.  Most of the buildings in the district were built after fires swept through the town in 1902 and 1925, although the Madison County Courthouse is an Art Deco structure built in 1939.  The district includes 32 historically significant buildings.

The district was listed on the National Register of Historic Places in 2008.

See also
National Register of Historic Places listings in Madison County, Arkansas

References

Buildings designated early commercial in the National Register of Historic Places in Arkansas
Art Deco architecture in Arkansas
Historic districts on the National Register of Historic Places in Arkansas
National Register of Historic Places in Madison County, Arkansas